The Capital City Service (CCS) is a Scottish football hooligan firm associated with Hibernian and active from 1984 when the casual hooligan subculture took off in Scotland. Their roots were in the previous incarnations of hooligans attached to the club and also the wider Edinburgh and surrounding areas gang culture. They are more commonly known in the media and amongst the public as the Hibs Casuals though within the hooligan network they may also be referred to as Hibs boys.

Criteria for inclusion
Below is a chronological list of incidents that the CCS has been noted as being involved in. The criteria for inclusion require that there must be evidence or an indication of:
 
 A date of when the incident took place
 An event that gave rise to the incident
 There was at least a handful of Hibs boys present

It is also preferred if a mention can be included of:

 Number and types of injuries to people 
 Number of arrests made by the police
 Instances of damage to property
 Use of weaponry

1984–85 season

1985–86 season

1986–87 season

1987–88 season

1988–89 season

1989–90 season

1990–91 to 1999–2000 seasons

2000–01 to 2009–10 seasons

2010–11 to 2016–17 seasons

See also
List of hooligan firms
Football-related activity of the CCS

References

Football hooliganism in the United Kingdom